Drogheda Park is a GAA stadium in Drogheda, County Louth, Ireland.  It is the home of the Louth gaelic football team. The ground has a capacity of about 3,500. It is one of the smallest county GAA stadium in Ireland. O'Raghallaighs GFC also use the county grounds for club games.

References

See also
 List of Gaelic Athletic Association stadiums
 List of stadiums in Ireland by capacity

Gaelic games grounds in the Republic of Ireland
Louth GAA
Sports venues in County Louth
Sport in Drogheda
Buildings and structures in Drogheda